The Lucin Cutoff is a  railroad line in Utah, United States that runs from Ogden to its namesake in Lucin. The most prominent feature of the cutoff was a  railroad trestle crossing the Great Salt Lake, which was in use from 1904 until the late 1950s, when it was replaced by an earthen causeway.

The cutoff was originally built by the Southern Pacific Railroad as a means of shortening the First transcontinental railroad. Today the cutoff is owned and operated by the Union Pacific Railroad as a significant part of the Lakeside Subdivision, which runs from Ogden to Wells, Nevada, and is one of the many subdivisions of the Overland Route. Due to the obstruction of water flow caused by the Lucin Cutoff, the Great Salt Lake appears to be different colors in aerial photographs; water north of the Cutoff appears red or brown, while water south of the Cutoff is more green.

History

Original construction

Built by the Southern Pacific Company (SP) between February 1902 and March 1904, the cutoff bypassed the original Central Pacific Railroad route through Promontory Summit where the golden spike was driven in 1869. Built under the direction of SP chief engineer William Hood, a team of 3,000 SP workers worked seven days a week to build the line.

When the line opened, it included short causeways extending from the western shore of the lake and the edge of Promontory Point, connected with a nearly  wooden trestle. The cutoff also included a causeway which spanned Bear River Bay from the eastern shore of the lake to Promontory Point. This section included a  trestle to allow Bear River water to flow into the lake.

By 1908, five passenger trains and seven freight trains were using the Lucin Cutoff in each direction daily.  In 1942, the original track between Lucin and Corinne, Utah was removed, including the remaining spikes on Promontory Point, and the scrap metal was donated to the war effort.

In late 1944, the Cutoff was the site of a train wreck in which 48 people were killed. A westbound  mail express train ran into the back of a slower moving passenger train in thick fog.

Trestle replacement
The trestle was functionally replaced in the late 1950s with a parallel dirt and rock causeway built under contract by Morrison-Knudsen of Boise, Idaho. The trestle remained in limited use alongside the causeway until roughly 1975. The railroad eventually sold salvage rights to the trestle and Cannon Structures, Inc., through its Trestlewood division, began to dismantle it in the early 1990s. Trestlewood continues to market and sell the salvaged trestle wood.

Openings in the causeway
The causeway prevented lake water from flowing as freely as the open trestle had, and to help mitigate effects, two culverts were included in the original causeway construction. The culverts allowed for boat traffic and a limited amount of water to flow from the lake's southern arm (where surrounding freshwater rivers emptied into the lake) into the lake's northern arm.

In the early 1980s, Utah experienced heavy flooding, and much of the extra water along the Wasatch Front flowed into the Great Salt Lake. This resulted in the lake experiencing historic high water levels and flooding nearby landowners. To aid the two culverts in channeling water to the northern arm, the State of Utah constructed a  bridge at the western end of the causeway. The state breached the causeway under the new bridge on August 1, 1984, allowing pent-up water from the southern arm to flow into the northern arm.

The continual slow sinking of the causeway has on occasion required more material to raise its height above the lake level. During the flooding of the 1980s, this buildup included placing 1,430 surplus railcars along the northern edge of the causeway and filling them with rock to act as gabions (this feature is known as the "Boxcar Seawall.")

In March 2011, Union Pacific Railroad (UP) requested permission to close the two 1950s-era culverts because of damage related to age and a sinking of the causeway into the lake bed; the two culverts were closed in 2012 and 2013. To mitigate the effects, the railroad was required to build a bridge and breach the causeway under that bridge. Construction of a  bridge was completed in fall 2016, although the railroad agreed to delay opening the breach for a few months, due to environmental and water level concerns. The causeway was breached beneath the 180-foot bridge on December 1, 2016. Since the opening of the causeway the level of the water in the arms of the lake has begun to equalize. As of April 30, 2017, the level of the lake in the northern arm is within a foot of the southern arm.

Due to the Southwestern North American megadrought, the amount of fresh water flowing into the southern arm of the lake had dropped significantly enough that, during the summer of 2022, a  berm was constructed in the breach beneath the 2016 bridge. This berm slows the flow of saltier water from the northern arm of the lake into the southern arm, as the increased salinity was beginning to have effects on the ecology of the southern part of the lake. Even though the lake's elevation in the southern part remained slightly higher than the northern part, the saltier water in the northern arm (which is denser and heavier) was able to push along the bottom of the breach into the southern arm of the lake.

See also
List of bridges documented by the Historic American Engineering Record in Utah
National Register of Historic Places listings in Box Elder County, Utah

References

External links

 Union Pacific Website – Striking a Balance on the Great Salt Lake
 Trestlewood Website – Lucin Cutoff Railroad Trestle
 Mike's Railroad History – Across the Great Salt Lake
 

Southern Pacific Railroad
Bridges completed in 1904
Railroad bridges in Utah
Rail infrastructure in Utah
Railroad bridges on the National Register of Historic Places in Utah
Former National Register of Historic Places in Utah
Transportation in Box Elder County, Utah
Transportation in Weber County, Utah
Great Salt Lake
Buildings and structures in Box Elder County, Utah
Buildings and structures in Weber County, Utah
Railroad cutoffs
Historic American Engineering Record in Utah
National Register of Historic Places in Box Elder County, Utah
Wooden bridges in the United States
Trestle bridges in the United States
Railway lines opened in 1904